Mirages: The Unexpurgated Diary of Anaïs Nin, 1939–1947 is a volume of diary entries by Anaïs Nin from her life between 1939 and 1947, first published in 2013 by Swallow Press. It was edited by Paul Herron, and features an introduction by Kim Krizan.

References

2013 non-fiction books
Books published posthumously
Diaries of Anaïs Nin
Swallow Press books